Big Issue is a 2019 South Korean television series starring Joo Jin-mo, Han Ye-seul and Shin So-yul. It aired from March 6 to May 2, 2019 on SBS TV.

Synopsis
It follows the story of a paparazzo who chases after celebrity scandals.

Cast

Main
 Joo Jin-mo as Han Seok-joo, an elite photo journalist who loses his job and family due to an incident, and becomes alcoholic. He then gets hired to become a paparazzo.
 Han Ye-seul as Ji Soo-hyun, a notorious editor-in-chief.
 Shin So-yul as Jang Hye-jung, a news reporter team leader.

Supporting
 Kim Dong-kyun as Bong Seol-cheol
 Kim Kyu-sun as Lee Myeong-ja
 Heo Hyung-gyu as Choi Kyung-sik
 Yang Hye-ji as Moon Bo-young	
 Park Han-sol as Jang Mi-rae
 Ahn Se-ha as a photo journalist
 Cha Soon-bae as Cha Woo-jin, deputy chief prosecutor.
 Park Jun-hee
 Choi Song-hyun as Bae Min-jung, Seok-joo's ex-wife.
 Seo Yi-soo as Han Se-eun
 Park Sin-ah as Choi Seo-hee
 Jo Hye-joo as a female assistant manager
 Park Ji-bin as Baek Eun-ho, an actor. (Ep. 9–12)

Special appearance
 Park Sang-nam as a journalist (Ep. 3)

Production
 The lead roles were first offered to actors Soo Ae and Park Shin-yang, but both declined.
 The first script reading of the cast was held on December 17, 2018; and filming began in the same month.
 Big Issue was rated 19 for episodes 1, 2, 13 to 16 by the Korea Communications Commission. The rating was rated 15 for all other episodes.

Controversy
On March 21, 2019, the broadcast of episodes 11 and 12 was peppered with incomplete computer graphics (CG) editing and visible production notes such as "Darken windows more" and "Erase all frame outlets". In one instance, color bars were also shown in between two of the scenes. SBS later issued an apology, stating that "there were various CG scenes in the episode... However, they were aired without the completed CG work and we apologize to the viewers for the accidents." In its statement, SBS also apologized to everyone who has been working on the show and stated that they would do their best in filming and editing in the future. The oversight highlighted the tight filming schedules in the South Korean broadcasting industry, and followed a similar incident in tvN's A Korean Odyssey where there were delays in removing the stunt actors' wires and processing the computer graphics.

Ratings

Notes

References

External links
  
 
 

Seoul Broadcasting System television dramas
Korean-language television shows
2019 South Korean television series debuts
2019 South Korean television series endings
Television series about journalism
Television series by HB Entertainment